Åland is demilitarised. This means that there may be no military presence and that the Islands may not be fortified. Åland is also neutralised, and must therefore be kept outside of war in case of a conflict. However, the Finnish Border Guard operates from stations in Mariehamn and Kökar, in case of a crisis these units could be transferred from the interior ministry to the defence ministry, thus becoming part of the military. Currently as being part of the interior ministry they do not constitute a military force and are thus not in violation of Åland's demilitarisation.

History 

When Åland was incorporated into the Russian Empire in 1809 the Islands’ new rulers initiated the construction of a large fortress at Bomarsund on the eastern side of the main island. During the Crimean War French and British troops attacked and seized the fortress, and at the ensuing peace negotiations held in Paris in 1856 Åland was demilitarised through a one-sided commitment from Russia.

When the League of Nations resolved the issue of Åland's constitutional affiliation in 1921 a decision was also taken to draw up an international convention. The convention, which confirmed the demilitarisation of 1856 and also neutralised Åland, was signed by ten states. Russia is not a party to the 1921 convention, but the 1940 Moscow Treaty on the Åland Islands and the 1947 Paris Peace Treaty contain provisions on the demilitarisation of Åland. Neutralisation is not mentioned, however.

Those who have right of domicile and moved to Åland before the age 12 are exempt from military service.

References 

Military of Finland
Åland